Yuliyan Mikhaylov Strogov (born March 28, 1972) is a boxer from Bulgaria. He was born in Dobrich. At the 1992 Summer Olympics he was stopped in the second round of the Men's Flyweight (51 kg) division by eventual bronze medalist Timothy Austin of the United States. At the 1996 Summer Olympics in the Men's Flyweight division, he was stopped in the first round by Ireland's Damaen Kelly. Strogov had won a silver medal in the same division earlier the same year, at the 1996 European Amateur Boxing Championships in Vejle.

References
Yuliyan Strogov's profile at Sports Reference.com
Biography of Yuliyan Strogov 

1972 births
Living people
Flyweight boxers
Boxers at the 1992 Summer Olympics
Boxers at the 1996 Summer Olympics
Olympic boxers of Bulgaria
People from Dobrich
Bulgarian male boxers
AIBA World Boxing Championships medalists